Dalton Town with Newton is a civil parish in the Barrow-in-Furness district, in the county of Cumbria, England. The parish includes the town of Dalton-in-Furness and the hamlet of Newton. In 2011 it had a population of 8,125. The parish touches Aldingham, Askam and Ireleth, Lindal and Marton and Urswick.

Features 
There are 70 listed buildings in Dalton Town with Newton.

History 
The parish was formed in 1987 from part of the unparished area of Dalton-in-Furness.

References 

Civil parishes in Cumbria
Barrow-in-Furness